For information on all Saint Mary's College of California sports, see Saint Mary's Gaels

The Saint Mary's Gaels football program was the intercollegiate American football team for Saint Mary's College of California in Moraga, California.

The school's first football team was fielded in 1892, and was dropped in 1899 going 7-6 in that span. The football program resumed again in 1915. In 1920 came one of the worst defeats in college football history, a 18 touchdown 127-0 defeat from neighboring University of California. The Gael's gained only 16 yards of offense the entire game. This lose drove St. Mary's to turn the program around by hiring Knute Rockne's protege, Slip Madigan who helped St. Mary's win 4 consecutive conference championships from 1925-1928. 

By 1927, Saint Mary's developed into one of the strongest football programs on the West Coast.  They defeated USC, UCLA, California, and Stanford.  The Stanford team they defeated in 1927 went on to play in the Rose Bowl, as did the USC team they defeated in 1931. Slip also lead the Gaels to the programs only 2 undefeated seasons in 1926, at 9-0-1, and 1929, at 8-0-1. Although the school's enrollment seldom exceeded 500, the 'Galloping Gaels' became a nationally known football power.

The famously red-clad jersey-ed 'Galloping Gaels', were known for their flashy style that reflected the personality of their flamboyant coach.  In the most notable win in program history, Saint Mary's traveled to New York City in 1930 to play Fordham in front of 65,000 at New York City's famed Polo Grounds. Madigan traveled to New York for the game with 150 fans on a train that was labeled "The World's Longest Bar."  To stir up publicity for the game, he then threw a party the night before the game and invited sportswriters and celebrities. Babe Ruth and New York mayor Jimmy Walker attended the party. Fordham was a heavy favorite, as the Rams had won 16 straight games going back to 1928.  They featured the first version of a defense known as the "Seven Blocks of Granite," a formidable unit that later would include Vince Lombardi.  Saint Mary's recovered from a 12–0 halftime deficit to win, 20–12.

The Gaels had a couple of shots at a national championship in the 1930's. A one-point loss to Cal in St. Mary’s opener in 1930 probably cost the school the No. 1 spot. In 1934, the Gaels beat Fordham and California, but were upset by Nevada, 9-7, and lost to UCLA, 6-0, and another national title had slipped away. The Gaels won the Cotton Bowl in January 1939 and lost in the Sugar Bowl in January 1946. That 1945 team won its first seven games and was ranked seventh in the AP poll entering the bowl game. They also lost in the 1946 Oil the following year.  Many home games of this era were played to sold out crowds at Kezar Stadium in 

The football program was dropped after the 1950  revived as a club sport, and returned to varsity status in 1970 (College Division, later Division III), and moved up to Division II  The team competed in NCAA Division I-AA as an independent from 1993 through 2003.

In order to keep its overall athletics program at Division I, football was required to cease or move up to Division I-AA by 1993. (Rival Santa Clara discontinued football after 1992.) After eleven seasons as an I-AA independent, Saint Mary's ended its football program on March 3, 2004, citing budgetary reasons.

Conference affiliation
• 1892-1899: Independent

• 1915-1924: Independent

• 1925-1928: Far Western Conference

• 1929-1950: Independent

• 1970-1979: College Division-Division III Independent

• 1980-1992: Division II Independent

• 1993-2003: Division I-AA Independent

Conference championships
St. Mary's won four consecutive conference championships in a row in their only time associated in an athletic conference. The Gaels have been an independent all other years of existence.

Bowl games

Head coaches
Slip Madigan and James Phelan are the only coaches that have lead the 'Galloping Gaels' to bowl games.

Rivalries

Oregon

Oregon and Saint Mary's College competed in an annual Thanksgiving Day classic between 1929–1935, played at Kezar Stadium in San Francisco's Golden Gate Park. The victors were awarded The Governors' Perpetual Trophy jointly by the governors of the states of California and Oregon. The Gaels hold a 7–3 lead in the series and final possession of the trophy. The rivalry is unlikely to be contested again, as Saint Mary's discontinued football in 1951 due to the national emergency resulting from the Korean War, and reinstated its program in 1970, only to discontinue it again after the 2003 football season.

College Football Hall of Fame

Pro Football Hall of Fame

National Award Winners

National Football Foundation Scholar-Athlete of the Year Award
Sean Laird (1997)

All Americans

Saint Mary's has 2 Consensus All-Americans and 1 Unanimous All-American (Herman Wedemeyer, HB- 1945)

Red Strader, FB- 1924 3rd Team
Larry Bettencourt, C- 1926 3rd Team - (College Football Hall of Fame) 
Larry Bettencourt, C- 1927 Consenus 1st Team - (College Football Hall of Fame) 
 Malcolm Franklin, DE- 1928 AP- 1st Team/ UP- 2nd Team
 George Ackerman, Tackle- 1929 1st/2nd
 Fred "Stud" Stennett, HB- 1929 UP- 2nd
Dick Boyle, HB- 1929 3rd
Harry Ebding, DE- 1930 AP-3rd Team/ 2nd Team
 Fred "Stud" Stennett, HB- 1930 AP-3rd Team
Bud Toscani, HB- 1931 2nd Team
Angelo Brovelli, FB- 1932 (UP-3rd Team; NEA-3rd Team; FWAA 1st Team)
Mike Steponovich, G- 1932 AP-3rd Team
 William "Bill" Beasley, QB- 1932 3rd Team
 Fred Conrinus, DE- 1933 (UP-3rd Team)
John Yezerski, DT- 1933 (NEA-1st Team)
Carl Jorgensen, DT- 1933 (1st Team/ UP-2nd Team/ 3rd Team
 George Wilson, HB- 1933 (2nd Team/ AP/UP-3rd Team)
 Marty Kordick, G- 1935 (NEA-2nd Team)
Herman Wedemeyer, HB- 1945 Consensus 1st Team (Unanimous All American) (College Football Hall of Fame) (AAB; AFCA; AP-1; COL-1; FWAA-1; INS-1; LK; SN; UP-1; CNS-1; CP-1; NL; OF-1; WC-1)
 Herman Wedemeyer, HB- 1946 (AP/ UP-2nd Team

Notable players

 Larry Bettencourt
 Tony Compagno
 Ryan Coogler
 Eddie Erdelatz
 John Henry Johnson
 Wagner Jorgensen

 Dante Magnani
 Dick Mesak
 Chase Peterson
 Bud Toscani
 Herman Wedemeyer
 Willie Wilkin
 Scott Wood
Andre Hardy

References

 
American football teams established in 1892
American football teams disestablished in 2004
1892 establishments in California
2004 disestablishments in California